Gabriela Heinrich (born 18 April 1963) is a German politician of the Social Democratic Party (SPD) who has been serving as a member of the Bundestag from the state of Bavaria since 2013.

Political career 
Heinrich first became a member of the Bundestag in the 2013 German federal election. In parliament, she has served on the Committee on Human Rights and Humanitarian Aid (2014-2019) and the Committee on Economic Cooperation and Development (2014-2018).

In addition to her role in parliament, Heinrich has been serving as member of the German delegation to the Parliamentary Assembly of the Council of Europe since 2014. On the Assembly, she has been a member of the Committee on Equality and Non-Discrimination (since 2014) and the Committee on Rules of Procedure, Immunities and Institutional Affairs (2015-2018). Since 2019, she has also been part of the German delegation to the Franco-German Parliamentary Assembly. Since 2022, she has been chairing the German-Israeli Parliamentary Friendship Group.

Within her parliamentary group, Heinrich has been serving as one of seven deputies of chairman Rolf Mützenich since 2019. She belongs to the Parliamentary Left, a left-wing movement within the group.

In the negotiations to form a so-called traffic light coalition of the SPD, the Green Party and the Free Democratic Party (FDP) following the 2021 federal elections, Heinrich was part of her party's delegation in the working group on foreign policy, defence, development cooperation and human rights, co-chaired by Heiko Maas, Omid Nouripour and Alexander Graf Lambsdorff.

Other activities
 German Foundation for World Population (DSW), Member of the Parliamentary Advisory Board

References

External links 

  
 Bundestag biography 

1963 births
Living people
Members of the Bundestag for Bavaria
Female members of the Bundestag
21st-century German women politicians
Members of the Bundestag 2021–2025
Members of the Bundestag 2017–2021
Members of the Bundestag 2013–2017
Members of the Bundestag for the Social Democratic Party of Germany
Politicians from Berlin